Fearless Undead Machines is an album by death metal band Deceased, released on Relapse Records in 1997.

Track listing

Personnel
King Fowley - drums, vocals
Mike Smith - guitars
Mark Adams - guitars
Les Snyder - bass
Mike Bossier - engineer
Wes Benscoter - cover art

Albums with cover art by Wes Benscoter
1997 albums
Relapse Records albums
Deceased (band) albums